Euchromia lurlina is a moth of the subfamily Arctiinae. It was described by Arthur Gardiner Butler in 1888. It is found on Thursday Island off the northern tip of Australia.

References

 Arctiidae genus list at Butterflies and Moths of the World of the Natural History Museum

Moths described in 1888
Euchromiina